Périgny, also known as Périgny-sur-Yerres, is a commune in the southeastern suburbs of Paris, France. It is located 23.3 km (14.5 mi) from the center of Paris.

Transport
Périgny is served by no station of the Paris Métro, RER, or suburban rail network. The closest station to Périgny is Boussy-Saint-Antoine station on Paris RER line D. This station is located in the neighboring commune of Boussy-Saint-Antoine, 2.1 km (1.3 mi) from the town center of Périgny.

Population

Education
Schools in the commune include Ecole maternelle Suzanne Heinrich (preschool/nursery) and Ecole élémentaire Georges Hure. Junior high school students are assigned to Collège Simone Veil in Mandres-les-Roses, built in 2007. Senior high school/sixth-form students may attend Lycée Guillaume Budé in Limeil-Brévannes and Lycée Christophe Colomb in Sucy-en-Brie.

See also
Communes of the Val-de-Marne department

References

External links

 Périgny, Val-de-Marne 

Communes of Val-de-Marne